Longwood station may refer to:

 95th Street–Longwood station, a Metra station in Chicago, Illinois
 Longwood station (MBTA), an MBTA streetcar station in Brookline, Massachusetts
 Longwood station (SunRail), a SunRail train station in Longwood, Florida

See also
Longwood (disambiguation)